Fear Factor is a Dutch stunt/dare game show TV format that first aired in the Netherlands. The show was adapted from the original Dutch version Now or Neverland and renamed Fear Factor by NBC for the American market.

The show pits contestants against each other in a variety of three stunts for a grand prize.

International versions

 Currently airing franchise
 Franchise with an upcoming season
 Franchise that has an unknown status
 Franchise that has suspended production
 Franchise that has ended

References

 
Television franchises
Banijay franchises